Arc Angels is a Blues rock supergroup formed in Austin, Texas in the early 1990s. The band came together after the death of Stevie Ray Vaughan and was composed of Vaughan’s friends Doyle Bramhall II and Charlie Sexton and two of the band members from Vaughan’s band Double Trouble, drummer Chris Layton and bassist Tommy Shannon. (Shannon has not been part of the group since 2010.)

The 'Arc' in the band's name came from the Austin Rehearsal Complex where the band first started jamming.

History
Arc Angels their 1992 debut album met with critical approval and reached No.127 on the Billboard chart.  The band made its network television debut on Late Night with David Letterman on June 9, 1992 performing "Living In A Dream." Arc Angels played Letterman again on January 6, 1993 with Too Many Ways to Fall."

Bramhall's heroin addiction as well as internal friction caused the breakup of the band in 1993. The Arc Angels broke-up in October of that year after concluding with a series of farewell concerts at Austin's Backyard Outdoor Venue. The band reunited for occasional live performances beginning in 2002.

In recent years, Bramhall played guitar and toured with Eric Clapton's band as well as Roger Waters.  Charlie Sexton toured with Bob Dylan.  Meanwhile, Layton and Shannon have recorded three albums with the Texas soul quintet Storyville.  The duo have also backed such artists as: Buddy Guy, Kenny Wayne Shepherd and John Mayer.

The members of Arc Angels (minus Shannon) announced that they would be reuniting in March 2009, releasing a live album and DVD of a concert from 2005 touring extensively and beginning work on their second album. The album/DVD "Living in a Dream" was released in 2009,. It contained live renditions of previously released Arc Angels songs, new songs performed live, and three new studio tracks. The launch of the Angels tour took place at Austin's annual South by Southwest Festival. Although the band never officially broke up again, members pursued solo projects and no talks about future Arc Angels releases or concerts have taken place to date. While on stage in 2014 Bramhall referred to the Arc Angels as "this band I was in" further confirming their demise. 

As of 2022, the band is performing once again with shows throughout the year.

Members

Current Members
Doyle Bramhall II - guitar, vocals (1990-1993, 2005-2010, 2022-Present)
Charlie Sexton - guitar, vocals (1990-1993, 2005-2010, 2022-Present)
Chris Layton - drums (1990-1993, 2005-2010, 2022-Present)

Former Members
Tommy Shannon - bass (1990-1993, 2005-2009)

Touring Members
Dave Monsey aka "Mark Newmark" - bass (2009-2010) Dave reportedly used an alias during the tour to avoid a contract violation
Eric Holden - bass (2022-Present)

Discography
Arc Angels (Geffen Records, 1992) US No. 127
Living in a Dream CD/DVD (2009)

References

External links 

 ARC Angels MySpace Site
 Arcangels.nl

American blues rock musical groups
Blues music supergroups
Rock music supergroups
Rock music groups from Texas
Musical groups from Austin, Texas
1990 establishments in Texas